El Capitan Books is an American comic book and graphic novel publisher, which exclusively publishes the work of its founder, David Lapham.

El Capitan's first release was Stray Bullets #1 in 1995, and the company is still best known for publishing this comic book series which continues today.

Other series which it has released include Murder Me Dead #1–9 (2000–2001) and The Parallax Man (2005).

The company is also well known for its collections of Stray Bullets stories (Innocence of Nihilism, Somewhere Out West, Other People, and Dark Days) in large European-style hardcover editions (and more recently in small US comic size softcover editions).

Comic book publishing companies of the United States